USS Piscataqua (Fleet Tug No. 49), later USS Piscataqua (AT-49), the third United States Navy ship of the name, was an armed tug in commission from 1898 to 1922. Early in her naval career, she saw service in the Spanish–American War, and she operated in the Philippines during and after the Philippine–American War.

Construction, acquisition, and commissioning
Piscataqua was completed in 1897 for W. H. Brown & Company as the commercial screw tug W. H. Brown by the F. W. Wheeler Company at West Bay City, Michigan. After the Spanish–American War broke out in April 1898, the U.S. Navy acquired her on 11 May 1898. She was commissioned as USS Piscataqua (Fleet Tug No. 49) on 18 June 1898.

Service history
Piscataqua served in the waters off Cuba during the Spanish–American War, which ended in August 1898. After a refit at Norfolk Navy Yard in Portsmouth, Virginia, from 12 to 27 December 1900, she rendezvoused in Hampton Roads, Virginia, with the gunboat , the patrol yacht , and the armed tug . The ships got underway for East Asia on 30 December 1900. The ships proceeded via the Mediterranean, the Suez Canal, Colombo, and Singapore to the Philippines, arriving at Cavite on Luzon in the Philippines on 24 April 1901. Piscataqua spent the rest of her career in the Asiatic Squadron and its successor, the United States Asiatic Fleet, and was designated a "fleet tug" with the hull classification symbol AT-49 on 17 July 1920, when the Navy adopted its modern, alphanumeric system of hull designations

Piscataqua was decommissioned at Cavite Navy Yard in the Philippines on 10 April 1922. Struck from the Navy List on 4 August 1930, she was sold for scrapping on 7 January 1931 in Manila to Rograciano Rodriquez, but was converted into a commercial barge instead of being scrapped.

References

Footnotes

Bibliography
 
 
 ibiblio.org Naval Historical Center Online Library of Selected Images: U.S. NAVY SHIPS: USS Piscataqua (1898-1931, later AT-49); Previously W. H. Brown (American Tug, 1897)

Tugs of the United States Navy
Spanish–American War ships of the United States
Philippine–American War ships of the United States
World War I auxiliary ships of the United States
1897 ships
Ships built in Bay City, Michigan